Pinches famosos is a Mexican show that premiered on Las Estrellas website on 14 August 2019. The show is presented by Arlette Foglia, chef and health coach, and Georgina Carrasco, pastry chef and enterprising. The show consists of invading the house of Mexican stars and preparing a dish with the ingredients they get in his house. The first consists of 15 episodes.

Episodes

Season 1 (2019)

References 

2019 Mexican television series debuts
Las Estrellas original programming
Spanish-language television shows